Tuscarora Township is a township in southwestern Juniata County, Pennsylvania, United States. The population was 1,138 at the 2020 census.

Geography
The township is in the Ridge-and-Valley province of the Appalachian Mountains. Blacklog Mountain and Shade Mountain occupy the northern part of the township, a series of smaller ridges and valleys occupy the center, and Tuscarora Mountain forms the southern edge. Tuscarora Creek, a tributary of the Juniata River, flows from southwest to northeast through the center of the township.

Tuscarora Township is bordered by Mifflin County to the north, Milford, Beale and Spruce Hill Townships to the east, Perry County to the south, and Lack Township to the west. The census-designated place of East Waterford is in the southeastern part of the county along Pennsylvania Route 75. Other unincorporated places in the township include Reeds Gap, McCoysville, McCullochs Mills, Bunker Hill, and Honey Grove.

Demographics

As of the census of 2000, there were 1,159 people, 445 households, and 335 families residing in the township.  The population density was 24.5 people per square mile (9.4/km).  There were 647 housing units at an average density of 13.7/sq mi (5.3/km).  The racial makeup of the township was 98.88% White, 0.17% African American, 0.26% Native American, 0.26% Asian, and 0.43% from two or more races. Hispanic or Latino of any race were 0.95% of the population.

There were 445 households, out of which 32.1% had children under the age of 18 living with them, 61.6% were married couples living together, 7.2% had a female householder with no husband present, and 24.5% were non-families. 20.2% of all households were made up of individuals, and 9.7% had someone living alone who was 65 years of age or older.  The average household size was 2.60 and the average family size was 2.99.

In the township the population was spread out, with 24.0% under the age of 18, 9.0% from 18 to 24, 27.9% from 25 to 44, 25.5% from 45 to 64, and 13.6% who were 65 years of age or older.  The median age was 38 years. For every 100 females, there were 108.5 males.  For every 100 females age 18 and over, there were 106.8 males.

The median income for a household in the township was $31,471, and the median income for a family was $37,614. Males had a median income of $26,714 versus $18,594 for females. The per capita income for the township was $15,264.  About 7.7% of families and 12.9% of the population were below the poverty line, including 14.5% of those under age 18 and 11.3% of those age 65 or over.

References

External links

Tuscarora Township official website

Populated places established in 1767
Townships in Juniata County, Pennsylvania
Townships in Pennsylvania
1767 establishments in Pennsylvania